The Institute of Nutrition of Central America and Panama, short INCAP is a supranational institution of the Central American Integration System (SICA).

In the 1960s, INCAP developed a plant-based drink called Incaparina, made from maize, cottonseed flour and soya bean flour and fortified with vitamins A, B1, B2, B3, calcium, zinc, phosphorus, and lysine (a protein).

References 

Central American Integration System
Nutrition organizations
Organizations based in Guatemala City
Intergovernmental organizations